Christian M'billi-Assomo (born 26 April 1995) is a Cameroonian-French middleweight boxer. Born in Cameroon, he moved to France in 2006 with his parents. He competed in the 2016 Olympics, but was eliminated in the third bout.

Professional boxing record

References

External links

 
 
 
 
 
 

1995 births
Living people
French male boxers
Olympic boxers of France
Boxers at the 2016 Summer Olympics
Cameroonian emigrants to France
Boxers at the 2015 European Games
European Games competitors for France
Middleweight boxers